Carlos Alberto Cuevas Maldonado (born 18 August 1986 in Ciudad Madero, Tamaulipas) is a Mexican professional footballer who last played for Correcaminos UAT of Ascenso MX.

Cuevas played for Altamira before the club relocated to Tapachula under the Cafetaleros brand.

References

External links
 
 

1986 births
Living people
Association football midfielders
Altamira F.C. players
Cafetaleros de Chiapas footballers
Correcaminos UAT footballers
Ascenso MX players
Liga Premier de México players
Footballers from Tamaulipas
People from Ciudad Madero
Mexican footballers